The Create a Comic Project (CCP) is a youth literacy program and webcomic created by John Baird. The program uses comics, many taken from the Internet, to encourage children to write their own narratives. The program began in November 2006 at the main branch of the New Haven Free Public Library as an after-school program. The project has since worked with several other groups, including the Children's Museum of Pittsburgh, Braddock Carnegie Library, and the Pittsburgh YMCA. Baird has presented the results of his work on the project at several conventions and conferences, including South by Southwest Interactive and SXSWedu. The project has been praised for its work in engaging children in learning by Marjorie Scardino, CEO of Pearson, Professor Mirta Ojito of Columbia University, and Arne Duncan, the US Secretary of Education.

The webcomic side of the project posts comics made by the children. The website was launched 4 January 2007. Archives of the Taiwan comics, labeled "Create a Comic Project ROC" or "CCP Version 1.0," go from 9 July 2005 through 28 November 2006. Comics generated in America, labeled "CCP Version 2.0," were first posted 29 November 2006 to present.

Project background
The Create a Comic Project was first conceived in the Republic of China while Baird was teaching English at Hess Educational Organization. He used it as an ESL activity in class. A version of the project was eventually published as part Hess's official curriculum materials in their Student Activities Booklet, which is currently used in both the ROC and Singapore. One of Baird's inspirations was the Penny Arcade Remix Project.

After going to New Haven for graduate school at Yale University, Baird remade the project as a stand-alone activity for the New Haven Public Library. Library staffers called the program "wonderful" and that it had "encouraged children to willingly express their creativity." In Pittsburgh, Baird hosted a number of workshops in the city before entering into a year-long collaboration with the Greater Pittsburgh YMCA's summer camp and after-school programs. While attending Teachers College, Columbia University, Baird brought the project into several area schools in the city, including LaGuardia High School and The School at Columbia University. From 2010 to 2012, the project was based in Houston, Texas, where Baird has given workshops to employees at the University of Texas Charter School and was invited to give workshops at the Conference for the Advancement of Math Teaching in 2011. The project is currently on hiatus.

The program hosted regular comic tournaments at the New Haven Library from 2007 to 2011. They were funded by grant awards from the Community Foundation for Greater New Haven. The CCP is the single largest multi-webcomic collaborative project of its kind. It was the only comic-based children's program of its type in New Haven and Pittsburgh.

In 2009, Baird and other webcomic creators held a panel and two project-based workshops at Otakon. The project has also hosted panels and workshops at Tekkoshocon in 2009 and 2010. John was named a Featured Panelist for Otakon 2012 for his series of workshops. A Wheaton University student has created art for the project's official materials.

Contributing comics

Various comic creators allow Baird to use their work for the Create a Comic Project. The first webcomic ever used was Okashina Okashi - Strange Candy, with others following later. They include (in alphabetical order):

 Pete Abrams - Sluggy Freelance
 Gene Ambaum - Unshelved
 Christopher Baldwin - Little Dee
 Gina Biggs - Red String
 Jennie Breeden - The Devil's Panties, Geebas on Parade
 Maritza Campos - College Roomies from Hell!!!, Doomies
 Jorge Cham - Piled Higher and Deeper
 Brian Clevinger - 8-Bit Theater
 D. J. Coffman - Hero By Night, Flo Bots
 Karen Ellis - Planet Karen
 Phil Foglio - Girl Genius
 Shaenon Garrity - Narbonic, Skin Horse, Smithson, Lil' Mell and Sergio
 Meredith Gran - Octopus Pie
 Chris Hastings - The Adventures of Dr. McNinja
 Faith Erin Hicks - Demonology 101, Ice
 Bill Holbrook - Kevin and Kell
 Jeph Jacques - Questionable Content
 Kazu Kibuishi - Copper, Flight
 Kittyhawk - Sparkling Generation Valkyrie Yuuki
 Jenn Manley Lee - Dicebox
 Nina Matsumoto - Saturnalia
 Ian McConville - Mac Hall, Three Panel Soul
 Randall Munroe - xkcd
 Vinson "Bleedman" Ngo - Sugar Bits, Powerpuff Girls Doujinshi, Grim Tales From Down Below
 Michael Poe - Errant Story, Exploitation Now
 Scott Christian Sava - The Dreamland Chronicles
 Emily Snodgrass - Okashina Okashi - Strange Candy
 Kean Soo - Jellaby
 David Stanworth - Snafu Comics, Tin
 Richard Stevens - Diesel Sweeties
 Tycho and Gabe - Penny Arcade
 Zach Weiner - Saturday Morning Breakfast Cereal

Awards

 In 2007, 2008, 2009, and 2010 the project won grants from the Community Foundation for Greater New Haven to support its tournament activity at the New Haven Public Library.
 In 2008, the project won a "This is Public Health" campaign award from the Association of Schools of Public Health (ASPH).
 In 2009, the project won a "Star of Distinction" from the University of Pittsburgh for its work in improving literacy among urban youths in Pittsburgh. It is the first and only youth literacy program in the city to have received this award.

Publications

Baird, John. Evaluating Math Concept Learning Using Comics. International Journal of Comic Art 15(1), 2013.
Baird, John & Dana Newborn. The Effect of Age on Comic Narrative Creation. International Journal of Comic Art 13(2), 2011.
Baird, John. Create a Comic: Inspiration. New York, NY: Lulu.com, 2010.
Baird, John. Create a Comic Project #1 (2nd Edition). New York, NY: Lulu.com, 2010.
Baird, John & Erin Ptah. Create a Comic Project #2. Pittsburgh, PA: Lulu.com, 2008.
Baird, John & Ryan Estrada. Create a Comic Project Presents: Climate Change. Pittsburgh, PA: Lulu.com, 2008.
Baird, John. Create a Comic Project #1. Pittsburgh, PA: Lulu.com, 2008.
Baird, John. "Create a Comic." In Language Learning Games and Activities Volume 3 pg 14-15, edited by Gary Bosomworth and Sheryn Williams. Taipei, Taiwan ROC: Hess Educational Organization, 2005.

See also

 Comic Book Project

References

External links
 Create a Comic Project

2000s webcomics
Educational webcomics
Parody webcomics
Webcomics in print
American comedy webcomics
Comic Genesis
United States educational programs
Educational projects
Educational organizations based in the United States
After school programs
Education in Taiwan
Education in New Haven, Connecticut
Education in Pittsburgh
Education in New York City
Education in Houston
YMCA
2007 webcomic debuts